The Rape of the Lock is a mock-heroic narrative poem written by Alexander Pope. One of the most commonly cited examples of high burlesque, it was first published  anonymously in Lintot's Miscellaneous  Poems and Translations (May 1712) in two cantos (334 lines); a revised edition "Written by Mr. Pope" followed in March 1714 as a five-canto version (794 lines) accompanied by six engravings. Pope boasted that this sold more than three thousand copies in its first four days. The final form of the poem appeared in 1717 with the addition of Clarissa's speech on good humour. The poem was much translated and contributed to the growing popularity of mock-heroic in Europe.

Description 

The poem of The Rape of the Lock satirises a minor incident of life, by comparing it to the epic world of the gods, and is based on an event recounted to Alexander Pope by his friend John Caryll. Arabella Fermor and her suitor, Lord Petre, were each a member of aristocratic recusant Catholic families, at a time in England when, under such laws as the Test Act, all denominations except Anglicanism suffered legal restrictions and penalties. (For example, Petre, being a Catholic, could not take the place in the House of Lords that would otherwise have been rightfully his.) Petre had cut off a lock of Arabella's hair without permission, and the consequent argument had created a breach between the two families. The poem's title does not refer to the extreme of sexual rape, but to an earlier definition of the word derived from the Latin rapere (supine stem raptum), "to snatch, to grab, to carry off"—in this case, the theft and carrying away of a lock of hair. In terms of the sensibilities of the age, however, even this non-consensual personal invasion might be interpreted as bringing dishonour.

Pope, also a Catholic, wrote the poem at the request of friends in an attempt to "comically merge the two" worlds, the heroic with the social. He utilised the character Belinda to represent Arabella and introduced an entire system of "sylphs", or guardian spirits of virgins, a parodised version of the gods and goddesses of conventional epic. Pope derived his sylphs from the 17th-century French Rosicrucian novel Comte de Gabalis. Pope, writing pseudonymously as Esdras Barnivelt, also published A Key to the Lock in 1714 as a humorous warning against taking the poem too seriously.

Pope's poem uses the traditional high stature of classical epics to emphasise the triviality of the incident. The abduction of Helen of Troy becomes here the theft of a lock of hair; the gods become minute sylphs; the description of Achilles' shield becomes an excursus on one of Belinda's petticoats. He also uses the epic style of invocations, lamentations, exclamations and similes, and in some cases adds parody to imitation by following the framework of actual speeches in Homer's Iliad. Although the poem is humorous at times, Pope keeps a sense that beauty is fragile, and emphasizes that the loss of a lock of hair touches Belinda deeply.

The humour of the poem comes from the storm in a teacup being couched within the elaborate, formal verbal structure of an epic poem. It is a satire on contemporary society which showcases the lifestyle led by some people of that age. Pope arguably satirises it from within rather than looking down judgmentally on the characters. Belinda's legitimate rage is thus alleviated and tempered by her good humour, as directed by the character Clarissa.

Dedicatory letter
Pope added to the second edition the following dedicatory letter to Mrs. Arabella Fermor:

Summary

In the beginning of this mock-epic, Pope declares that a "dire offence" (Canto 1 line 1) has been committed. A lord has assaulted a "gentle belle" (line 8), causing her to reject him. He then proceeds to tell the story of this offence.

While Belinda is still asleep, her guardian Sylph Ariel forewarns her that "some dread event impends". Belinda then awakes and gets ready for the day with the help of her maid, Betty. The Sylphs, though unseen, also contribute: "These set the head, and those divide the hair, some fold the sleeve, whilst others plait the gown" (146–147). Here Pope also describes Belinda's two locks of hair "which graceful hung behind". The Baron, one of Belinda's suitors, greatly admires these locks and conspires to steal one. Building an altar, he places on it "all the trophies of his former loves" (line 40), sets them on fire and fervently prays "soon to obtain, and long possess" (line 44) the lock.

Ariel, disturbed by the impending event although not knowing what it will be, summons many sylphs to her and instructs them to guard Belinda from anything that may befall her, whether she "forget her prayers, or miss a masquerade, Or lost her heart, or necklace, at a ball" (line 108–109). So protected, Belinda arrives at Hampton Court and is invited to play a game of ombre.

The conspiring Baron acquires a pair of scissors and tries to snip off one of her locks, but he is prevented by the watchful Sylphs. This happens three times, but in the end the Baron succeeds (also cutting a Sylph in two although Pope reassures us, parodying a passage in Paradise Lost, that "airy substance soon unites again" [line 152]). When Belinda discovers her lock is gone, she falls into a tantrum,  while the Baron celebrates his victory.

A gnome named Umbriel now journeys to the Cave of Spleen and from the Queen receives a bag of "sighs, sobs, and passions, and the war of tongues" (canto 4 line 84) and a vial filled "with fainting fears, soft sorrows, melting griefs, and flowing tears" (line 85–86) and brings them to Belinda. Finding her dejected in the arms of the woman Thalestris, Umbriel pours the contents over them both.

Many people, moved by Belinda's grief, demand the lock back, but the Baron is unrepentant and refuses. Clarissa admonishes them to keep their good humour, but they will not listen and instead a battle ensues with glares, songs and wits as weapons. Belinda fights with the Baron and throws snuff up his nose to subdue him. When she demands that he restore the lock, however, it is nowhere to be found. It has been made a constellation and is destined to outlast the contestants.

The Rape of the Bucket
Although John Ozell and Pope belonged to different political factions and later exchanged bitter insults, the coincidence of Ozell's translation of a pioneering Italian mock-heroic poem, at about the same time as the appearance of The Rape of the Lock, led to the claim that it might have served as the model for Pope's poem. Pope's original two-canto version had been published anonymously in 1712. Ozell's translation of the first two cantos of the 17th-century La secchia rapita was published the following year with the long title The Trophy Bucket: An heroi-comical poem. The first of the kind. Made English from the original Italian of Tassoni. But in consequence of the great success of Pope's expanded five-canto version of The Rape of the Lock in 1714, this time under his own name, Ozell's publisher Edmund Curll seized the opportunity to profit from its popularity by retitling his translation The Rape of the Bucket in a 1715 "second edition".

That Tassoni's poema eroicomico was the model for Boileau's Le Lutrin (The Lectern, 1674–83) is generally acknowledged. Both deflate an epic struggle to the size of a petty domestic squabble, but where Tassoni starts with an actual war and gives it an ignoble cause, Boileau begins with the trifling cause and compares it humorously with a Classical conflict. Narration of "What mighty contests rise from trivial things" is also Pope's method in The Rape of the Lock, and Boileau's work has been seen in its turn as Pope's model. However, the coincidence of the appearance of Ozell's translation of Boileau's original model at the same time as The Rape of the Lock led to the perception of a more direct connection between Pope's poem and Tassoni's, only strengthened by Curll's opportunistic retitling of Ozell's translation. It is an impression that remains to this day.

Introducing his 1825 translation of the whole of Tassoni's The Rape of the Bucket, James Atkinson compared the three mock-heroic poems, the Italian, the French and the English. But "there is little of similarity among them," in his view, their humour is distinct. "The Secchia Rapita indeed differs essentially from the Rape of the Lock, both in spirit, and execution. There is nothing in the latter that can be compared with the humour of the former, or with the admirably grotesque pictures with which it abounds".

Translations

Translations of Pope's poem into French, Italian and German were all made in the first half of the 18th century. Others in those languages followed later, as well as in Dutch, Czech, Estonian, Hungarian, Polish, Swedish and Danish. The work had originally come to European notice through an anonymous prose version, La Boucle de Cheveux Enlevée, published anonymously in 1728 and now ascribed either to Marthe-Marguerite, Marquise de Caylus, or to Pierre Desfontaines. Despite there being a playful French model for this kind of writing in Boileau's Lutrin, the translator claims of Pope's work in the preface that "I do not believe that there can be found in our language anything more ingenious, in this playful genre." A verse translation by Jean-François Marmontel followed in 1746.

The first German translation, Der merckwürdige Haar-Locken-Raub (1739), was a rendering of the French prose version of 1728. Luise Gottsched's verse translation, Der Lockenraub, was begun in the 1730s, again using a French prose version. However, she revised it totally once she managed to obtain the original text in English and in this way pioneered an interest in English literature in the German-language area. From then on, "Pope became very popular as a model for German poets from the 1750s onwards and remained an important source of inspiration throughout the second half of the 18th century," and in particular as a model for mock heroic poetry.
 
Early Italian verse translations of the poem include Andrea Bonducci's Il Riccio Rapito (Florence 1739), followed by Antonio Schinella Conti's version, begun much earlier and finally published in Venice in 1751. The vogue for Pope's work went on to blossom at the start of the 19th century with separate translations by Federico Federici (Faziola 1819), Vincenzo Benini (Milan 1819), Sansone Uzielli (Livorno 1822), and Antonio Beduschi (Milan 1830).

Scandinavian versions appeared near the start of the 19th century, beginning with the Swedish Våldet på Belindas låck (Stockholm, 1797) by Johan Lorens Odhelius (1737–1816). It was followed in 1819 by Den bortröfvade hårlocken by Jonas Magnus Stjernstolpe (1777–1831), and by the Danish imitation Belinde, eller den røvede Haarlok by Anton Martini (1773–1847) in 1829.

Parody and interpretation
In 1717 Giles Jacob published his bawdy parody, The Rape of the Smock, the plot of which turns on voyeurism and enforced seduction, building on erotic undertones present in Pope's poem which were to be taken up by its illustrators, and reached an apotheosis in Aubrey Beardsley's work.

The 1714 edition of The Rape of the Lock and those that followed from Lintot's press had come with six woodcuts designed by Louis Du Guernier. Although the work of this artist has been described as unimaginative, he goes beyond his literal brief in making Belinda sleep in unwarranted décolletage in the first canto, while in the second giving the "painted vessel" on its way down the Thames the tilted perspective of the Ship of Fools. Furthermore, Du Guernier's frontispiece owes its iconography to a print by Étienne Baudet after a painting by Francesco Albani of Venus at her Toilette, making for an identification of Belinda with the goddess.

The German translation of the poem published from Leipzig in 1744 had five copperplate engravings by Anna Maria Werner (1689–1753), the court painter of Saxony. It has been observed, however, that the places they depict are not specifically English and that the scene of the game of ombre in Canto 3 is "clearly based on a Leipzig coffee-house", complete with lapdogs tumbling on the floor.
 

Meanwhile, in Britain most illustrations of the work were descending into "high kitsch and low camp". The 1798 edition, for example, illustrated by a variety of contemporary artists, is particularly noted now for Thomas Stothard's watercolour in which fairies are pictured with wings. Advised by William Blake to make the sylphs like butterflies, Stothard decided to "paint the wing from the butterfly itself" and immediately went out to catch one.

Oil paintings by two artists rise a little above this judgment. Henry Fuseli's erotic The Dream of Belinda (1789–1790) goes beyond the actual episode to incorporate other imagery from the poem and some details peculiar only to Fuseli, such as the white moths in copulation in the lower foreground. He also illustrated the Cave of Spleen episode from Canto 4, but this met with contemporary scepticism and the original is now lost. Only Thomas Holloway's print remains to suggest that critics might have been right in seeing in it more "burlesque than sublimity". In the following century, Charles Robert Leslie's 1854 period piece, Sir Plume Demands the Restoration of the Lock, takes place in a cluttered drawing room in which the kind of lap dog present in many previous pictures feeds from a dish on the floor.

The nine photo-engravings with which Aubrey Beardsley "embroidered" the 1896 edition of the poem drew on the French rococo style, in which there was a contemporary revival of interest. Well received at the time, their enduring popularity can be attributed to their reinterpreting of the poem in ways only a very few had managed earlier.

Influence
Pope's fanciful conclusion to his work, translating the stolen lock into the sky, where "'midst the stars [it] inscribes Belinda's name", alludes to the similar myth about the hair of the (real-world) Berenice II of Egypt, said to have been taken up to the heavens as the constellation Coma Berenices. This celestial conclusion contributed to the eventual naming of three of the moons of Uranus after characters from The Rape of the Lock: Umbriel, Ariel, and Belinda. The first two are major bodies, named in 1852 by John Herschel, a year after their discovery. The inner satellite Belinda was discovered in 1986, and is the only other of the planet's twenty-seven moons taken from Pope's poem rather than Shakespeare's works.

Modern adaptations of The Rape of the Lock include Deborah Mason's opera-ballet, on which the composer worked since 2002. Its premiere was as an opera-oratorio in June 2016, performed by the Spectrum Symphony of New York city and the New York Baroque Dance Company. There was a 2006 performance at Sheffield University's Drama Studio of a musical work based on Pope's poem composed by Jenny Jackson.

References

External links 

 The Rape of the Lock at the Eighteenth-Century Poetry Archive (ECPA)
 The Rape of the Lock: Study Guide With Complete Text and Detailed Explanatory Notes

Narrative poems
Literary parodies
1712 poems
Works by Alexander Pope
Roman à clef novels
Mock-heroic English poems
Sylphs